Chongju may refer to:

 Chongju, a city in North Pyongan province, North Korea
 Cheongju, a city in North Chungcheong province, South Korea
 Cheongju (beverage), a variety of Korean rice wine